A mathematical constant is a key number whose value is fixed by an unambiguous definition, often referred to by a special symbol (e.g., an alphabet letter), or by mathematicians' names to facilitate using it across multiple mathematical problems.

Some constants arise naturally by a fundamental principle or intrinsic property, such as the ratio between the circumference and diameter of a circle. Other constants are notable more for historical reasons than for their mathematical properties. The more popular constants have been studied throughout the ages and computed to many decimal places.

All named mathematical constants are definable numbers, and usually are also computable numbers (Chaitin's constant being a significant exception).

Basic mathematical constants 

These are constants which one is likely to encounter during pre-college education in many countries.

Archimedes' constant  

The constant  (pi) has a natural definition in Euclidean geometry as the ratio between the circumference and diameter of a circle. It may be found in many other places in mathematics: for example, the Gaussian integral, the complex roots of unity, and Cauchy distributions in probability. However, its ubiquity is not limited to pure mathematics. For example, the ground state wave function of the hydrogen atom is

where  is the Bohr radius.

 is an irrational number and a transcendental number.

The imaginary unit  

The term "imaginary" was coined because there is no (real) number having a negative square.

In contexts where the symbol  is ambiguous or problematic,  or the Greek iota is sometimes used.

Euler's number  

Euler's number , also known as the exponential growth constant, appears in many areas of mathematics, and one possible definition of it is the value of the following expression:

The constant  is intrinsically related to the exponential function .

The Swiss mathematician Jacob Bernoulli discovered that  arises in compound interest: If an account starts at $1, and yields interest at annual rate , then as the number of compounding periods per year tends to infinity (a situation known as continuous compounding), the amount of money at the end of the year will approach  dollars.

The constant  also has applications to probability theory, where it arises in a way not obviously related to exponential growth.

Here,  guests are invited to a party, and at the door each guest checks his hat with the butler, who then places them into labelled boxes. The butler does not know the name of the guests, and hence must put them into boxes selected at random. The problem of de Montmort is: what is the probability that none of the hats gets put into the right box. The answer is

which, as  tends to infinity, approaches .

 is an irrational number.

Pythagoras' constant  

It is more precisely called the principal square root of 2, to distinguish it from the negative number with the same property.

Geometrically the square root of 2 is the length of a diagonal across a square with sides of one unit of length; this follows from the Pythagorean theorem. It was probably the first number known to be irrational. Its numerical value truncated to 65 decimal places is:
 .

Alternatively, the quick approximation 99/70 (≈ 1.41429) for the square root of two was frequently used before the common use of electronic calculators and computers. Despite having a denominator of only 70, it differs from the correct value by less than 1/10,000 (approx. 7.2 × 10 −5).

Theodorus' constant  

Constants in advanced mathematics 

These are constants which are encountered frequently in higher mathematics.

The Feigenbaum constants α and δ 

Iterations of continuous maps serve as the simplest examples of models for dynamical systems. Named after mathematical physicist Mitchell Feigenbaum, the two Feigenbaum constants appear in such iterative processes: they are mathematical invariants of logistic maps with quadratic maximum points and their bifurcation diagrams. Specifically, the constant α is the ratio between the width of a tine and the width of one of its two subtines, and the constant δ is the limiting ratio of each bifurcation interval to the next between every period-doubling bifurcation.

The logistic map is a polynomial mapping, often cited as an archetypal example of how chaotic behaviour can arise from very simple non-linear dynamical equations. The map was popularized in a seminal 1976 paper by the Australian biologist Robert May, in part as a discrete-time demographic model analogous to the logistic equation first created by Pierre François Verhulst. The difference equation is intended to capture the two effects of reproduction and starvation.

The numeric value of α is approximately 2.5029. The numeric value of δ is approximately 4.6692.

Apéry's constant ζ(3) 

Apery's constant is the sum of the series

Apéry's constant is an irrational number and its numeric value is approximately 1.2020569.

Despite being a special value of the Riemann zeta function, Apéry's constant arises naturally in a number of physical problems, including in the second- and third-order terms of the electron's gyromagnetic ratio, computed using quantum electrodynamics.

The golden ratio  

An explicit formula for the th Fibonacci number involving the golden ratio .

The number , also called the golden ratio, turns up frequently in geometry, particularly in figures with pentagonal symmetry. Indeed, the length of a regular pentagon's diagonal is  times its side. The vertices of a regular icosahedron are those of three mutually orthogonal golden rectangles. Also, it appears in the Fibonacci sequence, related to growth by recursion. Kepler proved that it is the limit of the ratio of consecutive Fibonacci numbers. The golden ratio has the slowest convergence of any irrational number. It is, for that reason, one of the worst cases of Lagrange's approximation theorem and it is an extremal case of the Hurwitz inequality for Diophantine approximations. This may be why angles close to the golden ratio often show up in phyllotaxis (the growth of plants). It is approximately equal to 1.6180339887498948482, or, more precisely 2⋅sin(54°) =

The Euler–Mascheroni constant γ 

The Euler–Mascheroni constant is defined as the following limit:

The Euler–Mascheroni constant appears in Mertens' third theorem and has relations to the gamma function, the zeta function and many different integrals and series.

It is yet unknown whether  is rational or not.

Conway's constant λ 

Conway's look-and-say sequence

Conway's constant is the invariant growth rate of all derived strings similar to the look-and-say sequence (except for one trivial one).

It is given by the unique positive real root of a polynomial of degree 71 with integer coefficients.

The value of λ is approximately 1.30357.

Khinchin's constant K 

If a real number r is written as a simple continued fraction:

where ak are natural numbers for all k, then, as the Russian mathematician Aleksandr Khinchin proved in 1934, the limit as n tends to infinity of the geometric mean: (a1a2...an)1/n exists and is a constant, Khinchin's constant, except for a set of measure 0.

The numeric value of K is approximately 2.6854520010.

The Glaisher–Kinkelin constant A 

The Glaisher–Kinkelin constant is defined as the limit:

It appears in some expressions of the derivative of the Riemann zeta function. It has a numerical value of approximately 1.2824271291.

Mathematical curiosities and unspecified constants

Simple representatives of sets of numbers 

Liouville's constant is a simple example of a transcendental number.

Some constants, such as the square root of 2, Liouville's constant and Champernowne constant:

are not important mathematical invariants but retain interest being simple representatives of special sets of numbers, the irrational numbers, the transcendental numbers and the normal numbers (in base 10) respectively. The discovery of the irrational numbers is usually attributed to the Pythagorean Hippasus of Metapontum who proved, most likely geometrically, the irrationality of the square root of 2. As for Liouville's constant, named after French mathematician Joseph Liouville, it was the first number to be proven transcendental.

Chaitin's constant Ω 

In the computer science subfield of algorithmic information theory, Chaitin's constant is the real number representing the probability that a randomly chosen Turing machine will halt, formed from a construction due to Argentine-American mathematician and computer scientist Gregory Chaitin. Chaitin's constant, though not being computable, has been proven to be transcendental and normal. Chaitin's constant is not universal, depending heavily on the numerical encoding used for Turing machines; however, its interesting properties are independent of the encoding.

Unspecified constants 

When unspecified, constants indicate classes of similar objects, commonly functions, all equal up to a constant—technically speaking, this may be viewed as 'similarity up to a constant'. Such constants appear frequently when dealing with integrals and differential equations. Though unspecified, they have a specific value, which often is not important.

In integrals 

Indefinite integrals are called indefinite because their solutions are only unique up to a constant. For example, when working over the field of real numbers

where C, the constant of integration, is an arbitrary fixed real number. In other words, whatever the value of C, differentiating sin x + C with respect to x always yields cos x.

In differential equations 

In a similar fashion, constants appear in the solutions to differential equations where not enough initial values or boundary conditions are given. For example, the ordinary differential equation y' = y(x) has solution Cex where C is an arbitrary constant.

When dealing with partial differential equations, the constants may be functions, constant with respect to some variables (but not necessarily all of them). For example, the PDE

has solutions f(x,y) = C(y), where C(y) is an arbitrary function in the variable y.

Notation

Representing constants 

It is common to express the numerical value of a constant by giving its decimal representation (or just the first few digits of it). For two reasons this representation may cause problems. First, even though rational numbers all have a finite or ever-repeating decimal expansion, irrational numbers don't have such an expression making them impossible to completely describe in this manner. Also, the decimal expansion of a number is not necessarily unique. For example, the two representations 0.999... and 1 are equivalent in the sense that they represent the same number.

Calculating digits of the decimal expansion of constants has been a common enterprise for many centuries. For example, German mathematician Ludolph van Ceulen of the 16th century spent a major part of his life calculating the first 35 digits of pi. Using computers and supercomputers, some of the mathematical constants, including π, e, and the square root of 2, have been computed to more than one hundred billion digits. Fast algorithms have been developed, some of which — as for Apéry's constant — are unexpectedly fast.

Graham's number defined using Knuth's up-arrow notation.

Some constants differ so much from the usual kind that a new notation has been invented to represent them reasonably. Graham's number illustrates this as Knuth's up-arrow notation is used.

It may be of interest to represent them using continued fractions to perform various studies, including statistical analysis. Many mathematical constants have an analytic form, that is they can be constructed using well-known operations that lend themselves readily to calculation. Not all constants have known analytic forms, though; Grossman's constant and Foias' constant are examples.

Symbolizing and naming of constants 

Symbolizing constants with letters is a frequent means of making the notation more concise. A common convention, instigated by René Descartes in the 17th century and Leonhard Euler in the 18th century, is to use lower case letters from the beginning of the Latin alphabet  or the Greek alphabet  when dealing with constants in general.

However, for more important constants, the symbols may be more complex and have an extra letter, an asterisk, a number, a lemniscate or use different alphabets such as Hebrew, Cyrillic or Gothic.

Erdős–Borwein constant Embree–Trefethen constant Brun's constant for twin prime Champernowne constants cardinal number aleph naught 
Examples of different kinds of notation for constants.

Sometimes, the symbol representing a constant is a whole word. For example, American mathematician Edward Kasner's 9-year-old nephew coined the names googol and googolplex.

Other names are either related to the meaning of the constant (universal parabolic constant, twin prime constant, ...) or to a specific person (Sierpiński's constant, Josephson constant, and so on).

Selected mathematical constants 

Abbreviations used:
 R – Rational number, I – Irrational number (may be algebraic or transcendental), A – Algebraic number (irrational), T – Transcendental number
 Gen – General, NuT – Number theory, ChT – Chaos theory, Com – Combinatorics, Inf – Information theory, Ana – Mathematical analysis

See also
 Invariant (mathematics)
 List of mathematical symbols
 List of numbers
 Physical constant

Notes

External links

 Constants – from Wolfram MathWorld
 Inverse symbolic calculator (CECM, ISC) (tells you how a given number can be constructed from mathematical constants)
 On-Line Encyclopedia of Integer Sequences (OEIS)
 Simon Plouffe's inverter
 Steven Finch's page of mathematical constants (BROKEN LINK)
 Steven R. Finch, "Mathematical Constants," Encyclopedia of mathematics and its applications, Cambridge University Press (2003).
 Xavier Gourdon and Pascal Sebah's page of numbers, mathematical constants and algorithms

 
Constants